Divernon is a village in Sangamon County, Illinois, United States. The population was 1,172 at the 2010 census, and 1,119 at a 2018 estimate. It is part of the Springfield, Illinois Metropolitan Statistical Area.

History
A post office has been in operation at Divernon since 1887. The village took its name after Di Vernon, a character in the novel Rob Roy. From 1900 to 1925, Madison Coal Company operated a large coal mine that caused rapid growth within the village. Since the closure of the mine the town has experienced a slow decline in population. The construction of the mine included the excavation of a large reservoir, locally known as the 'Resi', that is an integral part of the towns culture to this day. The reservoir is the host to the annual cardboard boat regatta.

On July 4, 1976 a local resident, George "Donald" Becker, fired a cannon that he had machined himself to celebrate the bicentennial of the United States declaring independence from Great Britain. The cannon was meant to launch a small projectile, also machined by Becker, a few dozen feet. Becker had underestimated the amount of powder he loaded in his homemade cannon however and the resulting discharge launched an approximately two-inch projectile over six hundred feet. The cannonball traveled across a baseball field, through multiple fences and storage buildings and only stopped when it entered a house and struck the homeowner "Lucky Bug" in the shoulder while he was eating dinner with his family, knocking him out of his chair. "Lucky Bug" was unharmed and quickly deduced that his neighbor had fired his cannon as he had seen Becker working on it in his shop and spoke with him about it. The Divernon Police Department confiscated the cannon and contacted the FBI. FBI agents visited the home of Becker to speak with him about the weapon he had created. While speaking with Becker at his home, "Lucky Bug" arrived with the cannonball and defended Becker stating that he had knew Becker for decades and that the damaged caused was completely unintentional. The FBI agents agreed with his conclusion and Becker was not charged. "Lucky Bug" kept the cannonball and carried it with him for the rest of his life remarking that he was the only person struck with a cannonball in Divernon and survived.

Geography
Divernon is located at  (39.566208, -89.655718).

Demographics

As of the census of 2000, there were 1,201 people, 480 households, and 340 families residing in the village. The racial makeup of the village was 98.67% White, 0.33% African American, 0.25% Asian, 0.17% from other races, and 0.58% from two or more races. Hispanic or Latino of any race were 1.42% of the population.

There were 480 households, out of which 35.2% had children under the age of 18 living with them, 56.9% were married couples living together, 9.4% had a female householder with no husband present, and 29.0% were non-families. 24.6% of all households were made up of individuals, and 11.0% had someone living alone who was 65 years of age or older. The average household size was 2.50 and the average family size was 2.98.

In the village, the population was spread out, with 26.6% under the age of 18, 8.0% from 18 to 24, 32.3% from 25 to 44, 20.3% from 45 to 64, and 12.7% who were 65 years of age or older. The median age was 36 years. For every 100 females, there were 92.8 males. For every 100 females age 18 and over, there were 95.3 males.

The median income for a household in the village was $43,750, and the median income for a family was $49,706. Males had a median income of $33,333 versus $26,042 for females. The per capita income for the village was $18,670. About 4.9% of families and 7.2% of the population were below the poverty line, including 12.0% of those under age 18 and 1.5% of those age 65 or over.

Education
Public schools are managed by Auburn Community Unit School District 10. Secondary education is provided by Auburn High School, located on North Seventh Street. The premises were previously occupied by Divernon High School.

Notable people
Joe Bukant, professional football player for the Philadelphia Eagles and Chicago Cardinals in the late 1930s and early 1940s.
Al Papai, MLB pitcher for the St. Louis Cardinals, St. Louis Browns, Boston Red Sox and Chicago White Sox

References

Villages in Sangamon County, Illinois
Villages in Illinois
Springfield metropolitan area, Illinois